Now is the Time is the sixth album by Japanese band Polysics. It is the first album of new material to be released in Japan, the United States of America, and the United Kingdom. Several tracks on the album were produced by Andy Gill of the band Gang of Four. The Japanese, US, and UK releases all have different track lists, each with exclusive tracks.

The songs "Coelakanth Is Android", "Baby BIAS" and "I My Me Mine" were released as singles in Japan.

Track listing
Japanese release (Released 10 October 2005 on Ki/oon Records)
 Tei! Tei! Tei!
 シーラカンス イズ アンドロイド (Coelakanth Is Android)
 I My Me Mine
 Ah-Yeah!!
 Walky Talky
 Wild One
 Rack Rack [Japan Exclusive]
 Toisu!
 Boy's Head
 Oh! Monaliza!
 Jhout
 The Next World [Japan Exclusive]
 Skip It
 Baby BIAS
 Bye-Bye-Bye

American release (Released 21 February 2006 on Tofu Records)
 Tei! Tei! Tei!
 Coelakanth Is Android
 I My Me Mine
 Ah-Yeah!!
 Walky Talky
 Wild One
 Super Sonic [US Exclusive]
 Toisu!
 Boy's Head
 Oh! Monaliza!
 Jhout
 Mr. Psycho Psycho [US & UK Exclusive]
 Skip It
 Baby BIAS
 Bye-Bye-Bye

UK release (Released 24 April 2006 on Tired & Lonesome Records)
 Coelakanth Is Android
 I Me My Mine
 Ah Yeah!
 Walky Talky
 Wild One
 Toisu!
 Metal Coconuts [UK Exclusive]
 Boy's Head
 Oh Monaliza!
 Baby BIAS
 Jhout
 Rain Rain Rain [UK Exclusive]
 Skip It!
 Psycho Psycho San [US & UK Exclusive]
 Life In Yellow [UK Exclusive]

2005 albums
Polysics albums
Albums produced by Andy Gill